is a village in Higashiusuki District, Miyazaki Prefecture, Japan.

As of October 1, 2019, the village has an estimated population of 1,532 and a density of 8.17 people per km². Its area is 187.56 km². Forestry and farming are the main industries, producing shiitake mushrooms, tea and miso. The community hosts many festivals steeped in Japanese traditional culture.

Morotsuka can be accessed by travelling northwest from Hyuga through Japan National Route 327, or via Japan National Route 503. The roads of Morotsuka were severely damaged by Typhoon Nanmadol in 2022.

Demographics 
Per Japanese census data, the population of Morotsuka has declined in recent decades.

References

External links

Morotsuka official website 

Villages in Miyazaki Prefecture